Yıldırım Mert Çetin (born 1 January 1997) is a Turkish professional footballer who plays as a centre-back for Adana Demirspor on loan from the Italian club Hellas Verona. He also represents the Turkey national team.

Club career
Çetin made his professional debut for Gençlerbirliği in a 2–1 Süper Lig loss to Kayserispor on 19 November 2017.

On 16 August 2019, he joined Italian Serie A club Roma. He was sent on a one-year loan to Hellas Verona on 25 August 2020, with an option to purchase.

On 15 January 2022, Hellas Verona announced that he has been loaned to Turkish club Kayserispor.

On 6 August 2022, Çetin joined Lecce on loan with an option to buy. On 19 January 2023, he was loaned to Adana Demirspor, with an option to buy.

International career
He made his debut for Turkey national team on 17 November 2019 in a Euro 2020 qualifier against Andorra, substituting Merih Demiral in the 80th minute.

References

External links
 
 
 
 Gençlerbirliği profile

1997 births
Living people
People from Çankaya, Ankara
Turkish footballers
Association football central defenders
Turkey international footballers
Gençlerbirliği S.K. footballers
Hacettepe S.K. footballers
A.S. Roma players
Hellas Verona F.C. players
Kayserispor footballers
U.S. Lecce players
Adana Demirspor footballers
Süper Lig players
TFF First League players
Serie A players
Turkish expatriate footballers
Expatriate footballers in Italy
Turkish expatriate sportspeople in Italy